Egnasia macularia is a species of moth of the family Noctuidae. It was described by Paul Mabille in 1900. It is endemic to Madagascar.

References

Calpinae
Moths described in 1900
Moths of Madagascar
Moths of Africa